Pedro Carrió García (born 1970 in Havana) is a former international swimmer from Cuba, who participated in various international competitions for his native country, starting in 1982. He maintains the National Records in Cuban Swimming for Free Style 400 meters (1990), 1,500 meters (1991) and Free Style Relay 800 meters (1991).

In the 15th Central American and Caribbean Games held in Santiago de los Caballeros in the Dominican Republic from June 24 to July 5, 1986, at the age of 16 yrs, he obtained two medals.

Gold
Men's 4x200 m Freestyle: Pedro Carrío
Men's 1500 m Freestyle: Pedro Carrío

In the 16th Central American and Caribbean Games held in Mexico City the capital of Mexico from November 20 to December 3, 1990 he obtained four medals.

Gold
Men's 200 m Freestyle: Pedro Carrío
Men's 4x200 m Freestyle: Pedro Carrío

Silver
Men's 400 m Freestyle: Pedro Carrío
Men's 1500 m Freestyle: Pedro Carrío

In the 11th Pan American Games held in Havana, Cuba from August 2 to August 18, 1991, he obtained two medals.

Bronze
Men's 1500 m Freestyle: Pedro Carrío 15:39.73
Men's 4x100 m Medley Relay: Cuba 3:45.96

In the 17th Central American and Caribbean Games were held in Ponce, from November 19 to November 30, 1993, he obtained three medals.

Gold
Men's 200 m Freestyle: Pedro Carrío
Men's 4x200 m Freestyle: Pedro Carrío

Bronze
Men's 400 m Freestyle: Pedro Carrío

References

1970 births
Living people
Cuban male freestyle swimmers
Sportspeople from Havana
Swimmers at the 1987 Pan American Games
Swimmers at the 1991 Pan American Games
Pan American Games bronze medalists for Cuba
Pan American Games medalists in swimming
Central American and Caribbean Games gold medalists for Cuba
Competitors at the 1986 Central American and Caribbean Games
Competitors at the 1990 Central American and Caribbean Games
Competitors at the 1993 Central American and Caribbean Games
Central American and Caribbean Games medalists in swimming
Medalists at the 1991 Pan American Games
20th-century Cuban people
21st-century Cuban people